Pre-B-cell leukemia transcription factor 2 is a protein that in humans is encoded by the PBX2 gene.

Function 

This gene encodes a ubiquitously expressed member of the TALE/PBX homeobox family. It was identified by its similarity to a homeobox gene which is involved in t(1;19) translocation in acute pre-B-cell leukemias. This protein is a transcriptional activator which binds to the TLX1 promoter. The gene is located within the major histocompatibility complex (MHC) on chromosome 6.

Interactions 

PBX2 has been shown to interact with HOXA9.

References

Further reading

External links 
 

Transcription factors